Androgenesis occurs when a zygote is produced with only paternal nuclear genes. During standard sexual reproduction, one female and one male parent each produce haploid gametes(such as a sperm or egg cell, each containing only a single set of chromosomes), which recombine to create offspring with genetic material from both parents. However, in androgenesis, there is no recombination of maternal and paternal chromosomes, and only the paternal chromosomes are passed down to the offspring (the inverse of this is gynogenesis, where only the maternal chromosomes are inherited, which is more common than androgenesis). The offspring produced in androgenesis will still have maternally inherited mitochondria, as is the case with most sexually reproducing species.

One of two things can occur to produce offspring with exclusively paternal genetic material: the maternal nuclear genome can be eliminated from the zygote, or the female can produce an egg with no nucleus, resulting in an embryo developing with only the genome of the male gamete.

Androgenesis blurs the lines between sexual and asexual reproduction–it is not strictly a form of asexual reproduction because both male and female gametes are required. However, it is not strictly a form of sexual reproduction because the offspring have uniparental nuclear DNA that has not undergone recombination, and the proliferation of androgenesis can lead to exclusively asexually reproducting species.

Androgenesis is seen in nature in the stick insect Bacillus rossius, the Tassili cypress tree Cupressus dupreziana, the little fire ant Wasmannia auropunctata, and several species of the clam genus Corbicula, and occasionally in fruit flies Drosophila melanogaster carrying a specific mutant allele. It has also been induced in many crops and fish via irradiation of an egg cell to destroy the maternal nuclear genome.

Elimination of the maternal nuclear genome

When androgenesis occurs via elimination of the maternal nuclear genome, the elimination takes place after fertilisation. The nuclei of the two gametes fuse as normal, but immediately afterwards the male nuclear genome then eliminates the female nuclear genome, leaving a fertilized ovum with only the nuclear genome of the male parent. If viable, the resulting offspring is a clone or sub-clone of the sperm or pollen parent.

Elimination of the maternal nuclear genome is evolutionarily advantageous for the male parent, because all offspring produced have the entirely paternally-inherited alleles: in contrast, a male parent that reproduces sexually without androgenesis only passes down half its genetic material to each of its offspring. A male allele promoting the elimination of the female gametic nucleus therefore has a high fitness advantage and can spread through a population and even reach fixation. However, this may be part of the reason androgenesis is very rarely observed in nature: despite being advantageous to the individual producing offspring, it is deleterious to the population as a whole: if an androgenesis-inducing allele reaches high frequencies, egg-producing individuals become rare. Because both egg- and sperm-producers are necessary for androgenesis, if the sex ratio becomes highly unbalanced and there are too few egg-producers, the population is driven to extinction. However, in hermaphrodites (species where a single individual produces both male and female gametes), this is less of a problem since there is no sex ratio.

Female production of a non-nuclear egg

Androgenesis can also occur through female production of an egg without a nucleus. Upon fertilization with pollen or sperm, there is no maternal nucleus to expel, and a zygote is produced that derives its nuclear genome entirely from its paternal parent. It is unclear why production of non-nucleate eggs would have evolved, because there is no fitness advantage to the egg parent: none of its nuclear genes are being passed onto its offspring. Therefore, any female allele causing non-nucleate egg production would be highly disadvantageous. This form of androgenesis could spread through genetic drift, or if there is some unknown benefit to the egg parent. Species in which non-nucleate egg production occurs are less likely to go extinct than species where the maternal nuclear genome is eliminated. This is because females producing non-nucleate eggs are disfavored by natural selection, so their proportion in a population will remain low.

Ploidy in androgenesis

Individuals produced through androgenesis can be either haploid or diploid (having one or two sets of chromosomes, respectively), depending on the species. Diploidy occurs through either the fusion of two haploid sperm cells or the duplication of chromosomes from one haploid sperm cell. In both cases the offspring experience a loss of genetic variation: individuals with the genome of 2 fused sperm cells will suffer from inbreeding depression, and individuals with the genome of a duplicated sperm will be fully homozygous. In species with male heterogamety (males have XY or XO chromosomes and females have XX, like in most mammals), the doubling of male chromosomes will cause all offspring to be female: if the sperm carries an X chromosome, the embryo must be XX, and if it carries a Y or O, the embryo will be YY or OO, and unviable. With sperm fusion, a quarter of fertilized eggs will be female (XX), half will be male (XO or XY), and a quarter will be non-viable (YY or OO).

Androgenesis is more common in haplo-diploid species, a species where sex is determined by ploidy, males generally develop from an unfertilized egg and females from a fertilized egg, than in diploid species (where all sexes are diploid). This is because with haplo-diploids, there is no requirement of the doubling of chromosomes from a haploid gamete, so theno embryos are lost due to YY or OO chromosomes.

Androgenesis in non-gonochoristic species

Androgenesis is more likely to persist in hermaphrodites than in species with two distinct sexes (gonochorists) because all individuals have the ability to produce ovum, so the spread of androgenesis-promoting alleles causing egg-producers to become scare is not an issue. Androgenesis is also seen more frequently in species that already have uncommon modes of reproduction such as hybridogenesis and parthenogenesis, and is sometimes seen in interspecies hybridization.

Induced androgenesis

Humans sometimes induce androgenesis to create clonal lines in plants (specifically crops), fish, and silkworms. A common method of inducing androgenesis is through irradiation. The egg cells can have their nuclei inactivated by gamma ray, UV, or X-ray radiation before being fertilized with sperm or pollen. A 2015 study was successful in producing zebrafish adrogenones by cold-shocking just fertilized eggs, which prevents the first cleavage event that doubles the chromosome number after parthenogenesis, and then heat-shocking them to double their chromosome number.

See also 
Parthenogenesis
Parthenocarpy

References 

Asexual reproduction